Po Lam is one of the 29 constituencies in the Sai Kung District.

The constituency returns one district councillor to the Sai Kung District Council, with an election every four years.

Po Lam constituency is loosely based on Po Lam Estate in Po Lam with estimated population of 15,416.

Councillors represented

Election results

2010s

References

Po Lam
Constituencies of Hong Kong
Constituencies of Sai Kung District Council
1991 establishments in Hong Kong
Constituencies established in 1991